James Pradier (born Jean-Jacques Pradier, ; 23 May 1790 – 4 June 1852) was a Genevan-born French sculptor best known for his work in the neoclassical style.

Life and work
Born in Geneva (then Republic of Geneva), Pradier was the son of a Protestant family from Toulouse. He left for Paris in 1807 to work with his elder brother, Charles-Simon Pradier, an engraver, and also attended the École des Beaux-Arts beginning in 1808. He won a Prix de Rome that enabled him to study in Rome from 1814 to 1818 at the Villa Medici. Pradier made his debut at the Salon in 1819 and quickly acquired a reputation as a competent artist. He studied under Jean-Auguste-Dominique Ingres in Paris. In 1827 he became a member of the Académie des beaux-arts and a professor at the École des Beaux-Arts

Unlike many of his contemporaries, Pradier oversaw the finish of his sculptures himself. He was a friend of the Romantic poets Alfred de Musset, Victor Hugo, Théophile Gautier, and the young Gustave Flaubert. His workshop was a meeting place for artists, presided over by his mistress, Juliette Drouet, who became Victor Hugo's mistress in 1833. After the liaison with Drouet ended, Pradier married Louise d'Arcet (1814-1885), daughter of the French chemist Jean-Pierre-Joseph d'Arcet, in 1833. They separated in 1845, after Pradier had become aware of her infidelities.<ref>Louise d'Arcet. in' Édition des Lettres de Juliette Drouet à Victor Hugo.</ref> They had three children: Charlotte (born 27 July 1834), John (b. 21 May 1836), and Thérèse (b. 3 July 1839). Due to her numerous lovers and her complicated financial lfe, Louise Pradier was among the inspirations for Flaubert when he wrote Madame Bovary.

The cool neoclassical surface finish of Pradier's sculptures is charged with an eroticism that their mythological themes can barely disguise. At the Salon of 1834, Pradier's Satyr and Bacchante created a scandalous sensation. Some claimed to recognize the features of the sculptor and his mistress, Juliette Drouet.  When the prudish government of Louis-Philippe refused to purchase it, Count (later Prince) Anatoly Nikolaievich Demidov bought it and took it to his palazzo in Florencethough many years later it would finally be on display in France, part of the Louvre's collection.

Other famous sculptures by Pradier are the figures of Fame in the spandrels of the Arc de Triomphe, decorative figures at the Madeleine, and his twelve Victories inside the dome of the Invalides, all in Paris. For his native Geneva he completed the statue of the Genevan Jean-Jacques Rousseau erected in 1838 on the tiny Île Rousseau, where Lac Léman empties to form the Rhône. Aside from large-scale sculptures, Pradier collaborated with François-Désiré Froment-Meurice, designing jewelry in a 'Renaissance-Romantic' style.

James Pradier is buried in the Père-Lachaise cemetery. Much of the contents of his studio were bought after his death by the city museum of Geneva.

Influence
Pradier's importance as an artist in his day is demonstrated by the fact that his portrait is included in François Joseph Heim's painting Charles X Distributing Prizes to Artists as the Salon of 1824, now in the Louvre Museum, Paris.

Pradier has been largely forgotten in modern times. In 1846 Gustave Flaubert said of him, however:This is a great artist, a true Greek, the most antique of all the moderns; a man who is distracted by nothing, not by politics, nor socialism, and who, like a true workman, sleeves rolled up, is there to do his task morning til night with the will to do well and the love of his art.An exhibition, Statues de chair: sculptures de James Pradier (1790–1852)  at Geneva's Musée d'Art et d'Histoire (October 1985 – February 1986) and Paris, Musée du Luxembourg (February – May 1986), roused some interest in Pradier's career and aesthetic.

Pradier's students included:

Marie-Noémi Cadiot, 1828–1888
Henri Chapu, 1833–1891
Gustave Crauck, 1827–1905
Antoine Étex, 1808–1888
Eugène Guillaume, 1822–1905
Henri Lehmann, 1814–1882
Eugène-Louis Lequesne, 1815–1887
Henri Le Secq, 1818–1882
Jacques-Léonard Maillet, 1823–1894
Pierre-Charles Simart, 1806–1857

Bibliography
 Fusco, Peter and H. W. Janson, editors, The Romantics to Rodin, Los Angeles County Museum of Art, 1980
 Hargrove, June, The Statues of Paris: An Open-Air Pantheon – The Histories of Statues of famous Men, Vendrome Press, New York, 1989
 Mackay, James, The Dictionary of Sculptors in Bronze, Antique Collectors Club,  Woodbridge, Suffolk, 1977
 Nineteenth Century French Sculpture: Monuments for the Middle Class'', J.B. Speed Museum, Louisville Kentucky, 1971

See also
List of works by James Pradier

References

External links

 Index of pages devoted to Pradier's works (French language)
 James Pradier in American public collections at the French Sculpture Census

1790 births
1852 deaths
Artists from the Republic of Geneva
French architectural sculptors
French sculptors
French male sculptors
Prix de Rome for sculpture
Burials at Père Lachaise Cemetery
Academic staff of the École des Beaux-Arts
Members of the Académie des beaux-arts